Monumental Head is a 1960 bronze sculpture by Alberto Giacometti, installed at the Hirshhorn Museum and Sculpture Garden in Washington, D.C., in the United States. The abstract work measures 37 x 11 3/4 x 14 3/4 inches and depicts a roughly modeled head with an extended neck.

See also
 1960 in art
 List of public art in Washington, D.C., Ward 2

References

1960 establishments in Washington, D.C.
1960 sculptures
Bronze sculptures in Washington, D.C.
Hirshhorn Museum and Sculpture Garden
Outdoor sculptures in Washington, D.C.
Sculptures by Alberto Giacometti
Sculptures of the Smithsonian Institution